Universidade Estadual do Maranhão (UEMA, English: State University of Maranhão) is a public state university in the state of Maranhão, Brazil. It was founded on March 25, 1987, and is based in São Luís. In addition to the Universidade Federal do Maranhão (UFMA), it was the second university in the state. In September 2016, part of it was dismembered for creation of a third, the newly founded Universidade Estadual da Região Tocantina do Maranhão (UEMASUL). With more than 20 thousand students, the institution has 22 campuses and 25 university centers. In the university ranking, it ranks 157th in Brazil. The university rector is Gustavo Pereira da Costa.

History 
UEMA had its origin in the Federation of Higher Schools of Maranhão (Federação das Escolas Superiores do Maranhão – FESM), created by Law 3,260, of August 22, 1972, to coordinate and integrate students from Maranhão higher education system. FESM, initially, was created by four higher education units: School of Administration, School of Engineering, School of Agronomy and Faculty of Caxias. In 1975, FESM incorporated the São Luís School of Veterinary Medicine and, in 1979, the Faculty of Education of Operators.

An FESM was transformed into the State University of Maranhão – UEMA, through Law No. 4,400, of December 30, 1981, and its operation was authorized by Federal Decree No. 94,143, of March 25, 1987, as a special regime Autarchy, legal entity of public law, in the multicampi modality. Initially, UEMA has three fields and seven teaching units:

Basic Studies Unit;
Engineering Studies Unit;
Administration Studies Unit;
Agronomy Studies Unit;
Veterinary Medicine Studies Unit;
Caxias Education Studies Unit;
Imperatriz Education Studies Unit

UEMA was subsequently reorganized by Laws 5,921, of March 15, 1994, and 5,931, of April 22, 1994, amended by Law 6,663, of June 4, 1996. In principle, UEMA was linked to the State Secretariat of Education. After the administrative reform implemented by the State Government in 1999, SEDUC was transformed into the Human Development State Management – GDH.

UEMA was separated from the GDH by State Law No. 7,734, dated April 19, 2002, which provided for new changes in the Government's administrative structure, and became part of the State Planning and Management Department.

On January 31, 2003, with Law No. 7,844, the State underwent a new structural reorganization. The State System for Scientific and Technological Development was created, of which UEMA became part, and the university started to be linked to the State Management of Science, Technology, Higher Education and Technological Development – GECTEC, today, Secretary of State of Science, Technology, Higher Education and Technological Development – SECTECz

Campi 
With its main campus in its own  Cidade Universitária Paulo VI , the university maintains 19 training and study centers scattered across the state:

 Bacabal: Centro de Estudos Superiores de Bacabal – CESB
 Balsas: Centro de Estudos Superiores de Balsas – CESBA
 Barra do Corda: Centro de Estudos Superiores de Barra do Corda – CESBAC
 Caxias: Centro de Estudos Superiores de Caxias – CESC
 Codó: Centro de Estudos Superiores de Codó – CESCD
 Coelho Neto: Centro de Estudos Superiores de Coelho Neto – CESCON
 Colinas: Centro de Estudos Superiores de Colinas – CESCO
 Coroatá: Centro de Estudos Superiores de Coroatá – CESCOR
 Grajaú: Centro de Estudos Superiores de Grajaú – CESGRA
 Itapecuru-Mirim: Centro de Estudos Superiores de Itapecuru-Mirim – CESITA
 Lago da Pedra: Centro de Estudos Superiores de Lago da Pedra – CESLAP
 Pedreiras: Centro de Estudos Superiores de Pedreiras – CESPE
 Pinheiro: Centro de Estudos Superiores de Pinheiro – CESPI
 Presidente Dutra: Centro de Estudos Superiores de Presidente Dutra – CESPD
 Santa Inês: Centro de Estudos Superiores de Santa Inês – CESSIN
 São João dos Patos: Centro de Estudos Superiores de São João dos Patos – CESJOP
 São Luís: Centro de Ciências Agrária – CCA, Centro de Ciências Sociais Applicadas – CCSA, Centro de Educação, Ciências Exatas e Naturais – CECEN, Centro de Ciências Tecnológicas – CCT
 Timon: Centro de Estudos Superiores de Timon – CESTI
 Zé Doca: Centro de Estudos Superiores de Zé Doca – CESZD

Libraries 

The central library of the library network is in São Luís, the library system had a total of 61,598 different monographs, 4,500 electronic publications and around 1,400 journals in 2018.

Publications 
Current publications:  Anuário 
 Universidade Estadual do Maranhão: Anuário. São Luís 2018 (PDF, 23,1 MB; Brazilian Portuguese).

References

External links

See also 

Rankings of Universities in Brazil
 Universidade Federal do Maranhão
Education in State of Maranhão

Universities and colleges in Maranhão
São Luís, Maranhão
Educational institutions established in 1987
Forestry education
1987 establishments in Brazil
State universities in Brazil